Mount Fox is a dormant volcano located in the locality of Mount Fox, 50 km west of Ingham, Shire of Hinchinbrook, Queensland, Australia. Mount Fox has a shallow crater and a lava flow that extends away from the southern base of the cone. The cone lies on basaltic lava flows that are 23.6 million years old. Mount Fox is famous for its volcanic crater, which was formed 100,000 years ago by a volcanic eruption.

See also
 List of volcanoes in Australia

References
 Volcano Image Gallery: Mount Fox, Geoscience Australia

External links
 VolcanoWorld at Oregonstate
 

Mountains of Queensland
Volcanoes of Queensland
Pyroclastic cones
North Queensland